Marnix Vervinck (born 9 August 1959) is a Belgian archer. He competed in the men's individual event at the 1984 Summer Olympics.

References

External links
 

1959 births
Living people
Belgian male archers
Olympic archers of Belgium
Archers at the 1984 Summer Olympics
People from Beernem
Sportspeople from West Flanders